Nebraska Raceway Park is a multiuse racing facility in southeastern Nebraska near Greenwood, Nebraska.

The track is near the interchange of Interstate 80 and Nebraska Highway 63 at exit 420. 

I-80 Speedway is part of the Nebraska Raceway Park, which also has Little Sunset Speedway made for Go-Kart racing. And a motorcross track is located behind the track.

External links 
 Official Website

Buildings and structures in Cass County, Nebraska
Dirt oval race tracks in the United States
Motorsport venues in Nebraska
Tourist attractions in Cass County, Nebraska